The ICFTU Inter American Regional Organisation of Workers (ORIT) was the regional organization of the International Confederation of Free Trade Unions (ICFTU) for the Americas.

The federation was formed in 1951, and described its objective as being to work for independent, autonomous, democratic unions throughout the Americas.  The ICFTU merged with the World Confederation of Labor in 2006, and in 2008, ORIT merged with the WCL's former regional organisation for the Americas, the Latin American Confederation of Workers, to form the Trade Union Confederation of the Americas.

As of 2005, the organization had 65 affiliated or fraternal organizations, in 29 countries, representing 50 million workers.

Member TUCs
The following national organizations were affiliated with ORIT in 2005:
Argentina
Confederación General del Trabajo de la República Argentina
Barbados
Barbados Workers' Union
Belize
National Trade Union Congress of Belize (Fraternal, not affiliated)
Brazil
Central Única dos Trabalhadores
Confederação Geral dos Trabalhadores
Canada
Canadian Labour Congress
Confédération des syndicats nationaux
Chile
Central Unitaria de Trabajadores
Colombia
Confederación de Trabajadores de Colombia
Central Unitaria de Trabajadores de Colombia (Frat.)
Costa Rica
Confederación de Trabajadores Rerum Novarum
Dominica
Waterfront and Allied Workers' Union
Dominican Republic
Confederación Nacional de Trabajadores Dominicana
Confederación de Trabajadores Unitaria
Ecuador
Confederación Ecuatoriana de Organizaciones
El Salvador
Central de Trabajadores Democráticos
Unión Nacional de Trabajadores Campesinos (Frat.)
Guatemala
Confederación de Unidad Sindical de Guatemala
Unidad Sindical de Trabajadores de Guatemala (Frat.)
Central de Trabajadores del Campo (Frat.)
Guyana
Guyana Trades Union Congress
Honduras
Confederación de Trabajadores de Honduras
Confederación Unica de Trabajadores de Honduras
Jamaica
Jamaica Confederation of Trade Unions
Mexico
Confederación Nacional de Trabajadores
Unión Nacional de Trabajadores
Montserrat
Montserrat Allied Workers' Union
Nicaragua
Confederación de Unificación Sindical
Central Sandinista de Trabajadores
Panama
Confederación de Trabajadores de la República de Panamá
Convergencia Sindical
Paraguay
Central Unica de Trabajadores
Peru
Confederación Gral de Trabajadores del Perú
Confederación Unitaria de Trabajadores del Perú
Suriname
Algemeen Verbond van Vakverenigingen de Moederbond (Frat.)
Trinidad and Tobago
National Trade Union Centre of Trinidad and Tobago
United States
AFL-CIO
Uruguay
Asociación de Bancarios del Uruguay
Venezuela
Confederación Trabajadores de Venezuela

Criticism
In June 2006 an American labor magazine, Labor Notes, documented the role that the ORIT, ICFTU, ILO, and the AFL-CIO played in supporting elements opposed to the government of Haitian leader Aristide.  ORIT is alleged to have ignored massive labor persecution against public sector workers and trade unionist supporters of the ousted government throughout 2004, 2005, and 2006.

Leadership

General Secretaries
1951: Francisco Aguirre
1952: Luis Alberto Monge
1958: Alfonso Sanchez Madariaga
1961: Arturo Jáuregui
1974: Julio Etcheverry Espinola
1977: Juan Del Pino
1983: Tulio Cuevas
1986: Luis Anderson McNeil
2003: Víctor Báez

Presidents
1951: Arturo Sabroso Montoya
1952: Luis Alberto Colotuzzo
1955: Ignacio Gonzalez Tellechea
1961: Alfonso Sanchez Madariaga
1970: Blas Chumacero
1974: Rafael Camacho Guzmán
1977: Alfonso Sanchez Madariaga
1997: Dick Martin
2001: Linda Chavez-Thompson

References

International organizations based in the Americas
Trade unions established in 1951
Trade unions disestablished in 2008
Organisations based in São Paulo